Manali Pudhunagar also known as Manali New Town is a neighbourhood developed by CMDA that falls under the newly formed Tiruvottiyur taluk of North Chennai Revenue Division of Chennai city in the Indian state of Tamil Nadu.

Development and controversies
Manali Pudhunagar was among the first areas to receive desalinated water from the Minjur desalination plant.

Though Manali Pudhunagar was created as a satellite township by CMDA in the 1980s, CMDA has yet to hand it over to the local bodies concerned with the better development of civic amenities.

References

Neighbourhoods in Chennai